The Diocese of Minna (Anglican Communion) is one among the 11 dioceses in the Anglican Province of Lokoja in the Church of Nigeria.
The current Bishop of Minna diocese is Daniel Yisa.

References 

 http://www.anglicancommunion.org/structures/member-churches/member-church.aspx?church=nigeria&view=prov#sorting
 http://www.minnaanglicandiocese.org/index.php/home/the-diocese

Anglican Province of Lokoja